Bottom Creek is an unincorporated community located in McDowell County, West Virginia, United States. Bottom Creek lies along U.S. Route 52 between the towns of Kimball and Vivian. It takes its name from the stream that runs through the community.

Notable person

Boxing trainer Emanuel Steward was born in Bottom Creek, and spent his early childhood there.

References

Unincorporated communities in McDowell County, West Virginia
Unincorporated communities in West Virginia